Mam talent! is the Polish version of the Got Talent series. The aim of the program is to choose the most talented person from people showing their talents. The winner of the show in the first series got €100,000, in the second and third series – 300,000 złotys. Prizes for people from the second and third place are chosen by producers of the shows. The show is hosted by Marcin Prokop and Michał Kempa, and the judges are Agnieszka Chylińska, Małgorzata Foremniak and Jan Kliment. od. 13 September 2008. do. 30 November 2019. od. 4 September 2021. 2008-2019 do. 2021

Qualifications 
In spring, there were preliminary castings 2008 1 edycja  kwietnia 2008 maja 2008 czerwiec 2008  kwietnia 2009 maja 2009  czerwiec  2009 2 edycja   koronawirus castingus 2020 COVID-19 kwiecien-czerwiec 2020 13 edycja wrzesien 2020 nie jesienia  (not broadcast on TV) which chose qualifying participants for the usual presentations with jury, audience and cameras. In the second stage of qualifications, held in the capital of country Warsaw, 4000 people/groups appeared. The jury sent 130 through to the next stage. Decisions by the jury were made by casting a positive or negative vote. To continue on in the competition, the participant needed to receive two positive votes. If any of the jury members does not like a performance, they can press a button which switches on a red cross; 3 red crosses ends the performance. From the 130 qualifying acts, the jury chose 40 to appear in the semi-finals. Starting with Season 7, each jury member, as well as each of two hosts, can use the "golden buzzer" once across all performances; each act that receives this buzzer bypasses jury selection and moves directly to semi-finals.

Semi-finals 
Participants of five semi-finals show their talents in live programs in front of jury (the same as in qualifications), cameras and audience. In every semi-final 8 people/groups of the 40 appear. Jury votes in the same way like before, but the decision about participants going to the next stage is made by viewers, who can call or send a SMS to vote for a participant. The participant who gets the most votes is going to the final stage, and from the two people who got the second and third place in viewers' voting one person which goes to the final is chosen by the jury. From the second season of the show the results of incomplete votings are shown on the website of the show. The complete results are shown after the broadcast of program ends.

Final stage 
10 participants take part in the final stage, two from each semi-final. The voting is the same as in semi-finals, but there is other way of choosing the winner. At first, people who got the three first places are read in random way. Then the person who got third place's name is read. At the end, name of the winner is read by hosts and they give him a cheque for 300,000 zlotys (100,000 zlotys for the person who got second place is given after the program). After the ceremony of awarding the winner again is shown.

Judges and Presenters

Judges

Guest Judges

Series overview

Series 1 (2008) 
I season of Mam talent! was broadcast by TVN from 13 September – 29 November 2008. It consisted of 5 qualifications episodes, 5 semi-finals and 1 final (totally – 11 episodes, which were broadcast every week on Saturdays from 20:35 to 22:20, only the final episode to 22:35). Winner of the first season was the acrobatics duo Mellkart Ball, Klaudia Kulawik took the second place, and the third place was taken by music group AudioFeels.

Series 2 (2009) 
II season of Mam talent! was broadcast by TVN from 12 September – 5 December 2009. It consisted of 7 qualifications episodes, 5 semi-finals and 1 final (totally – 13 episodes, which were broadcast every week on Saturdays – qualifications episodes from 20:35, semi-finals and finals from 20:00). Winner of the second season was Marcin Wyrostek. Alexander Martinez won a trip to the Philippines for him and his wife and daughter (his wife comes from Poland), and also 5,000 zlotys from Itaka travel agency.

Series 3 (2010) 

III season of Mam talent! was broadcast by TVN from 4 September – 27 November 2010. It consisted of 7 qualifications episodes, 5 semi-finals and 1 final (totally – 13 episodes, which were broadcast every week on Saturdays). Winner of the third season was Magda Welc.

Series 4 (2011) 

IV season of Mam talent! was broadcast by TVN from 3 September – 26 November 2011. It consisted of 7 qualifications episodes, 5 semi-finals and 1 final (totally – 13 episodes, which were broadcast every week on Saturdays). Winner of the third season was Kacper Sikora. Małgorzata Foremniak and Agnieszka Chylińska returned as judges. They were joined by a new judge, Robert Kozyra. He replaced Kuba Wojewódzki, who had left the show in order to focus on judging X Factor.

Series 5 (2012) 

V season of Mam talent! was broadcast by TVN from 1 September – 24 November 2012. It consisted of 7 qualifications episodes, 5 semi-finals and 1 final (totally – 13 episodes, which were broadcast every week on Saturdays). Winner of the third season was the acrobatics duo Delfina & Bartek. Małgorzata Foremniak, Robert Kozyra and Agnieszka Chylińska returned as judges.

Series 6 (2013) 

VI season of Mam talent! was broadcast by TVN from 7 September – 30 November 2013. It consisted of 7 qualifications episodes, 5 semi-finals and 1 final (totally – 13 episodes, which were broadcast every week on Saturdays). Małgorzata Foremniak and Agnieszka Chylińska returned as judges. They were joined by a new judge, Agustin Egurrola. He replaced Robert Kozyra.

Series 7 (2014) 

VII season of Mam talent! was broadcast by TVN from 6 September – 6 December 2014. It consisted of 7 qualifications episodes, 5 semi-finals and 1 final (totally – 13 episodes, which were broadcast every week on Saturdays). Małgorzata Foremniak, Agnieszka Chylińska and Agustin Egurrola returned as judges. This series will see the introduction of the new golden buzzer, following the concept of the original British series Britain's Got Talent.

Series 8 (2015) 
VIII season of Mam talent! was broadcast by TVN from 5 September – 28 November 2015.  It consisted of 7 qualifications episodes, 5 semi-finals and 1 final (totally – 13 episodes, which were broadcast every week on Saturdays).  Małgorzata Foremniak, Agnieszka Chylińska and Agustin Egurrola returned as judges.

Series 9 (2016) 
IX season of Mam talent! was broadcast by TVN from 3 September – 26 November 2016.  It consisted of 7 qualifications episodes, 5 semi-finals and 1 final (totally – 13 episodes, which were broadcast every week on Saturdays).  Małgorzata Foremniak, Agnieszka Chylińska and Agustin Egurrola returned as judges. Marcin Prokop and Szymon Hołownia returned as hosts.

Series 10 (2017) 
X season of Mam talent! was broadcast by TVN from 9 September – 2 December 2017.  It consisted of 7 qualifications episodes, 5 semi-finals and 1 final (totally – 13 episodes, which were broadcast every week on Saturdays).  Małgorzata Foremniak, Agnieszka Chylińska and Agustin Egurrola returned as judges. Marcin Prokop and Szymon Hołownia returned as hosts.

Series 11 (2018) 
XI season of Mam talent! was broadcast by TVN from 8 September – 1 December 2018.  It consisted of 7 qualifications episodes, 5 semi-finals and 1 final (totally – 13 episodes, which were broadcast every week on Saturdays).  Małgorzata Foremniak, Agnieszka Chylińska and Agustin Egurrola returned as judges. Marcin Prokop and Szymon Hołownia returned as hosts.

Series 12 (2019) 
XII season of Mam talent! was broadcast by TVN from 7 September -  30 November 2019. r. It consisted of 7 qualifications episodes, 5 semi-finals and 1 final (totally – 13 episodes, which were broadcast every week on Saturdays).  Małgorzata Foremniak, Agnieszka Chylińska and Agustin Egurrola returned as judges. Marcin Prokop and Szymon Hołownia returned as hosts.

Series 13 (2021) 
XIII season of Mam talent! was broadcast by TVN from f 4 September - 27 November 2021. It consisted of 7 qualifications episodes, 5 semi-finals and 1 final (totally – 13 episodes, which were broadcast every week on Saturdays). What is certain is the fact that in "Got Talent!" There will be two new rules, One will be the Platinum Button. Thanks to it, the person selected by the jury during the semi-finals will get directly to the finals. The second will be a wild card, i.e. a pass to the finals. It will be awarded to the person who was eliminated in the semi-finals, but won the most votes from viewers. Małgorzata Foremniak, Agnieszka Chylińska returned as judges. They were joined by a new judge, Jan Kliment. He replaced Agustin Egurrola. Marcin Prokop returned as host. He was joined by a new host, Michał Kempa. He replaced Szymon Hołownia.

Series 14 (2022) 
XIV season of Mam talent! was broadcast by TVN from 3 September - 26 November 2022. r.
It consisted of 7 qualifications episodes, 5 semi-finals and 1 final (totally – 13 episodes, which were broadcast every week on Saturdays).
Małgorzata Foremniak, Agnieszka Chylińska and Jan Kliment returned as judges. Marcin Prokop and Michał Kempa returned as hosts.

Special season

Talent kontra Factor (Talent vs Factor) (27 September 2014 )

This episode was live from Lublin. There were two teams – contestants from Mam talent! and from X Factor. Mam Talent! team leader was Agnieszka Chylińska (MT judge) and X Factor team Tatiana Okupnik (X Factor Judge). Agnieszka Szulim was the presenter of the show.

Contestants:
Mam Talent Group:
 Marcin Wyrostek (season 2, winner)
 Anna Dudek (season 4, finalist)
 Marta Podulka (season 4, 3rd place)
 Piotr Karpienia (season 4, runner-up)
 Me, Myself and I (season 3, finalist)
X Factor Group:
 Ewelina Lisowska (season 2, 4th place)
 Artem Furman (season 4, winner)
 Grzegorz Hyży (season 3, runner-up)
 Klaudia Gawor (season 3, winner)
 The Chance (season 2, 3rd place)
 Trzynasta w samo południe (season 4, 5th place)
Contest Performances:

Albums by former contestants 

 AudioFeels (season 1, 3rd place)
 UnCovered (5 October 2009)
 Unfinished (7 November 2011)
 Live (18 January 2013)
 Świątecznie (12 December 2013)
 Ewa Lewandowska (season 1, finalist)
 Idą święta (28 November 2008)
 Paulina Lenda (season 1, finalist)
 Wolf Girl (24 April 2014)
 Krzysztof Kadela "Blady Kris" (season 1, finalist)
 Beatbox Rocker (28 June 2014)
 Marcin Wyrostek (season 2, winner)
 Magia Del Tango (16 December 2009)
 Marcin Wyrostek & Coloriage (15 November 2010)
 Ania Teliczan (season 2, finalist)
 Ania Teliczan (16 January 2012)
 Marcin Madox Majewski (season 2, semi-finalist)
 La révolution Sexuelle (4 October 2011)
 Kasia Popowska (season 2, auditions)
 Tlen (16 September 2014)
 Magdalena Welc (season 3, winner)
 Sianko na stół. Kolędy i pastorałki (14 November 2011)
 Kamil Bednarek (season 3, runner-up)
 Ziemia Obiecana (EP)(November, 2009)
 Szanuj (19 November 2010)
 Jamaican Trip (EP) (24 June 2011)
 Jestem... (28 November 2012)
 Przystanek Woodstock 2013: Bednarek (1 May 2014)
 Przystanek Woodstock 2014: Bednarek (4 December 2014)
 Oddycham (29 May 2015)
 Piotr Lisiecki (season 3, 3rd place)
 Rules Changed Up (27 April 2011)
 Me Myself And I (season 3, finalist)
 Takadum! (3 March 2009)
 Do Not Cover (21 March 2012)
 Damian Skoczyk (season 3, semi-finalist)
 Nie sam (Julie, 31 2012)
 Piotr Karpienia (season 4, runner-up)
 Mój Świat (15 May 2012)
 Marta Podulka (season 4, 3rd place)
 Nie przeszkadzać (30 October 2015)
 Sound’n’Grace (season 4, finalist)
 Atom (2 June 2015)
 Bartłomiej Grzanek (season 5, finalist)
 Duch (16 October 2015)

Number of viewers

Concert tour 
From 8 to 13 December 2009 there was Mam Talent! concert tour. All finalists of the second season appeared there live in Lublin, Poznań, Wrocław and Warsaw. Klaudia Kulawik, Paulina Lenda and Ssnake from the final of the first season appeared there. All concerts were hosted by Marcin Prokop.

References

External links 
 Show's official website

 
2008 Polish television series debuts
Television series by Fremantle (company)
TVN (Polish TV channel) original programming
Polish television series based on British television series